Ammi Hondo (born January 2, 1997) is a Japanese para-alpine skier.

Hondo was born without fingers on her left hand.

She won a bronze medal at the 2019 World Para Alpine Skiing Championships in the downhill competition.

She also participated in the Women's super combined and Women's Super-G competitions as well as the Women's Slalom and Women's Giant slalom competitions at the 2018 Winter Paralympics.

She also competed at the 2022 Winter Paralympics held in Beijing, China.

References 

1997 births
Living people
Paralympic alpine skiers of Japan
Alpine skiers at the 2018 Winter Paralympics
Alpine skiers at the 2022 Winter Paralympics
Japanese female alpine skiers
21st-century Japanese women